Heatwave in Berlin part 1

Plot summary

Australian Joy von Muhler is returning with her husband Stephen to Berlin, in the early 1960s, to visit his family.  The pair have been married for 10 years after Stephen migrated to Australia following World War II.  They return to a Berlin still struggling with damage caused in the war, and to a wealthy family still hiding secrets about their war-time involvement.

Reviews

A reviewer in The Canberra Times was not impressed with the novel: "Dymphna Cusack's new documentary novel, Heatwave in Berlin, has the pace, the excitement and something of the basic hollowness of a thriller...What it makes as a novel,
however, is something which cannot be taken very seriously. The characters have the larger-than-life quality of figures in a melodrama, and they speak with something of the same staginess."

See also 

 1961 in Australian literature

References

1961 Australian novels
Novels by Dymphna Cusack